This list of botanical gardens in Lithuania is intended to include all significant botanical gardens and arboretums in Lithuania.

 Botanical Garden of Klaipėda University  – Klaipėda
 Botanical Garden of Vilnius University – Vilnius
 Dubrava Arboretum – Kaunas District Municipality
 Izidoriaus Navidansko Botanical Park – Ylakiai Eldership, Skuodas District Municipality
 Kretinga Winter Garden – Kretinga
 Palanga Botanical Park – Palanga
 Šiauliai University Botanical Garden  – Šiauliai
 Traupis Primary School Botanical Garden – Traupis
 Vytautas Magnus University Botanical Garden – Kaunas
 Vytautas Magnus University Agriculture Academy Arboretum – Kaunas District Municipality

See also
 Botanical garden
 Gardening
 History of gardening
 List of botanical gardens

External links 
 List of botanical gardens in Lithuania
 History of botanical gardens in Lithuania

 
Botanical gardens
Lithuania
Botanical gardens